WGHN-FM 92.1 is a radio station licensed to Grand Haven, Michigan.

History
WGHN-FM signed on the air on January 28, 1969.  In 1976 the station changed its call letters to WFMG (those calls are now used at 101.3 FM in Richmond, Indiana) and separated programming from its AM sister, airing an easy listening format while the AM station continued with a format of adult contemporary music and talk.  After the stations were sold in 1983, the FM's call letters were changed back to WGHN-FM and the two stations resumed simulcasting, which continued until January 4, 2008.

2007-08: Sale and Changes
WGHN owners Bill Struyk, President and General Manager, and Ron Mass, Vice President (known on the air as "Ron Stevens"), announced in April 2007 that they were selling WGHN and WGHN-FM to Lansing-based businessman Will Tieman, owner of Michigan State University's Spartan Sports Network. Struyk told the Grand Haven Tribune that he and Mass were both ready for retirement (1). Despite speculation that Tieman would try to move WGHN out of Grand Haven to become a Muskegon- or Grand Rapids-market station, Tieman told The Muskegon Chronicle that he did not plan to make any major programming changes (see: "New owner plans to keep WGHN local," The Muskegon Chronicle, May 8, 2007) 1, nor would he immediately discontinue WGHN's University of Michigan sports broadcasts in favor of Michigan State sports.

In early January 2008, Will Tieman discontinued WGHN's simulcast of the FM signal and changed the format to ESPN Radio.  92.1 FM continues with its adult contemporary format.  It is also home to NASCAR auto racing on weekends.

On November 21, 2022 WGHN-FM and sister station WMPA went off the air due to being evicted from their tower site by the city of Grand Haven. WGHN-FM's adult contemporary has temporally moved to sister station WGHN 1370 AM, replacing that station's oldies format.

On January 31, 2023 WGHN-FM resumed broadcasting after being silent.

Current Programming
The weekday broadcast lineup on WGHN-FM consists of John Roberts in the morning, at work listening during the middays and Mary Ellen Murphy in afternoon drive.  They carry CBS News as well as local news, sports and weather.  They are the Michigan State University Football/Basketball affiliate for Muskegon, Grand Haven and Holland.

In the fall Grand Haven High School football airs on Friday nights, then basketball during that season.  WGHN-FM mainly serves the Ferrysburg, Spring Lake and Grand Haven communities in Northwest Ottawa County.

Sources
Michiguide.com - WGHN-FM History
Michiguide.com - WGHN History

References

External links

GHN-FM
Mainstream adult contemporary radio stations in the United States
Radio stations established in 1969
1969 establishments in Michigan
Grand Haven, Michigan